Portraits of His Children is the sixth short story collection by author George R.R. Martin. The collection was first published in July 1987 by Dark Harvest. It contains 11 short stories.

The hardcover edition featured interior artwork by illustrators Val Lakey Lindahn and Ron Lindahn.

The title story, originally published in November 1985 in Asimov's Science Fiction, won the 1986 Nebula Award for Best Novelette and the Science Fiction Chronicle Readers Poll, and was nominated for the Hugo Award for Best Novelette.

Contents

References

Short story collections by George R. R. Martin
1980s science fiction works
1987 short story collections